Sebastián Fernández Wahbeh (born 12 July 2000 in Caracas) is a Venezuelan-Spanish racing driver. He competed in the 2019 FIA Formula 3 Championship for Campos Racing, and the 2020 FIA Formula 3 Championship with ART Grand Prix.

Racing career

Lower formulae
Fernández spent his first two seasons in single-seaters in the Italian, German, Spanish and Emirati Formula 4 championships. He scored his first victory in the penultimate race of the 2016 Italian F4 Championship at Monza, while in 2017 he would win five races and finish 4th in the standings.

FIA Formula 3 European
2018 would see Fernández competing in the final season of the FIA Formula 3 European Championship for the Motopark team. Even though he had prior experience with the team, having driven for them in the 2016-17 Formula 4 UAE Championship, he would only manage to achieve two points finishes and would eventually come 21st in the driver's championship.

FIA Formula 3 Championship
Despite this, Fernández was signed by Campos Racing for the inaugural Formula 3 campaign. He would do even worse than in the season before and score no points, with a 12th place in Barcelona being his best result. He would finish 27th is the championship, the third lowest out of all drivers who competed in every event.

The ART Grand Prix team signed Fernández to partner Frenchman Théo Pourchaire and Russian Aleksandr Smolyar for the 2020 season. Fernández took pole position, his first in FIA Formula 3, at the opening round at the Red Bull Ring. However, he was eliminated from the race after a collision at the first turn.

Racing record

Career summary 

† As Fernández was a guest driver, he was ineligible for points.

Complete Italian F4 Championship results
(key) (Races in bold indicate pole position) (Races in italics indicate fastest lap)

Complete FIA Formula 3 European Championship results 
(key) (Races in bold indicate pole position) (Races in italics indicate fastest lap)

Complete FIA Formula 3 Championship results
(key) (Races in bold indicate pole position; races in italics indicate points for the fastest lap of top ten finishers)

† Driver did not finish the race, but was classified as he completed over 90% of the race distance.

Complete Macau Grand Prix results

References

External links
 

Venezuelan racing drivers
2000 births
Living people
FIA Formula 3 European Championship drivers
FIA Formula 3 Championship drivers
Spanish F4 Championship drivers
ADAC Formula 4 drivers
F3 Asian Championship drivers
MP Motorsport drivers
Campos Racing drivers
ART Grand Prix drivers
Italian F4 Championship drivers
Formula Renault Eurocup drivers
Euronova Racing drivers
Mücke Motorsport drivers
Motopark Academy drivers
Bhaitech drivers
Arden International drivers
Pinnacle Motorsport drivers
Karting World Championship drivers
UAE F4 Championship drivers
Lamborghini Super Trofeo drivers